Kevin Santos Lopes de Macedo (born 4 January 2003), simply known as Kevin, is a Brazilian professional footballer who plays for Palmeiras.

Early life 
Kevin grew up in Itaim Paulista, a district of São Paulo, starting to play football in Porto Feliz's Desportivo Brasil, after refusing an Atlético Mineiro contract as an under-13, with the club being too far from his home.

Club career 
After playing the Campeonato Paulista Série A3 with Desportivo Brasil, Kevin joined SE Palmeiras's under-20 in 2020, on a one-year loan with a buyout clause that eventually resulted in a permanent transfer.

He made his professional debut for Palmeiras on the 1st December 2021, replacing Giovani during a 3–1 Serie A away win against Cuiabá.

The young winger or second striker started his first game on the 10 December 2021, also scoring his first senior goal on this occasion, the winner of a 1–0 home win against Ceará concluding the unbeaten league season of the recent Copa Libertadores winners.

References

External links

Desportivo Brasil profile

2003 births
Living people
Brazilian footballers
Association football forwards
Sociedade Esportiva Palmeiras players
Campeonato Brasileiro Série A players
Footballers from São Paulo (state)